Predražići is a village in the municipality of Zavidovići, Bosnia and Herzegovina.

Demographics 
According to the 2013 census, its population was 228.

References

Populated places in Zavidovići